Lielbērze is a village in Auri Parish and Dobele Municipality in the historical region of Zemgale, and the Zemgale Planning Region in Latvia.

Notable people 
 Lizete Iesmiņa-Mihelsone, actress and opera singer

Dobele Municipality
Towns and villages in Latvia